Allah Verdi Kandi (also Romanized as Allah Verdī Kandī; also known as ‘Abd ol ‘Alī Kandī) is a village in Gejlarat-e Gharbi Rural District, Aras District, Poldasht County, West Azerbaijan Province, Iran. At the 2006 census, its population was 236, in 55 families.

References 

Populated places in Poldasht County